The  Left of Croatia is a marginal leftist Croatian political party with no parliamentary representation.

Origins
Left of Croatia was created in 2007 by the merger of several parties:
Vladimir Bebić – Third Block
Green Left of Croatia
Social Democratic Union
Dalmatian Assembly
Olive
Socialist Party of Croatia – Left Alternative
, an SDP dissident

Social Democratic Union
The Social Democratic Union was founded in 1992, following Croatian independence, being one of very few political parties to identify itself as left-wing. Most of their members were former Communists or left-wingers displeased embracing Croatian nationalism, the excesses of privatisation and human rights abuses of ethnic minorities. The first leader of the party was Branko Horvat, noted economist and one of the few Croatian intellectuals to oppose the dissolution of SFR Yugoslavia. In the early 1990s, the SDU was also one of the few political parties to openly advocate co-operation and integration of Croatia with other republics of former Yugoslavia, a view very different from the current Croatian political mainstream. In the 1992 parliamentary elections it turned out that SDU nevertheless enjoyed some degree of support, especially among ethnic Serbs living in government-controlled territories. Although it failed to break the 2% vote threshold of entry into the Croatian Parliament, the SDU could have hoped to win three seats by fulfilling the constitutional quota of ethnic Serbs in Sabor. Instead, the Croatian Constitutional Court, in one of the most controversial decisions in their history, ruled that the seats should go to Serb People's Party as an "ethnic party", and presumably the only true representative of ethnic Serb minority, despite the fact SNS won fewer votes than SDU.

The SDU had some success in the local elections held a few months later, but the biggest boost came to them with parliamentary status gained when , a colorful member of Sabor from Rijeka, decided to join their ranks. Bebić, who enjoyed a great deal of popularity in the Croatian public, gradually became the party's leader. In the 1995 election he managed to increase the SDU's vote margin, but with increased vote threshold (5%), the SDU failed to enter Sabor. This, the appearance of more mainstream left-wing parties, and the establishment of a rejuvenated SDP as Croatia's main opposition party, led to the SDU becoming more marginalized, struck with internal divisions and gradually phased out in late 1990s. After the Socialist Labour Party of Croatia (SRP) was formed, many SDU members joined that organization.

The SDU formed joint lists for local elections in 2005 with the SRP, the Green Party and the Green Left of Croatia, but failed to enter any of the regional assemblies.

Socialist Party of Croatia – Left Alternative
The Socialist Party of Croatia – Left Alternative was a leftist party formed in 2004 when several members left the Socialist Labour Party of Croatia. In the local elections of 2005, the party had joint lists with the Social Democratic Party of Croatia in the town of Glina and with the Independent Democratic Serb Party in Sisak-Moslavina County, where it gained one seat in the assembly.

Green Left of Croatia
The Green Left of Croatia was a leftist party formed in 2001 whose political platform was ecological socialism.

On the local elections in 2005, it formed a joint list with the Social Democratic Union and two other green parties. The coalition got 0.39% vote in Zagreb. It ceased to exist in 2006 and in 2007 merged into the Left of Croatia.

Ideology
The Party sees itself as the protector of the workers and other disadvantaged parts of society. It considers the privatization process in the nineties after the breakup of Yugoslavia to be criminal and supports free education and healthcare. Anti-fascism is declared to be one of basis of the party. The party claims to support small business in competition with “foreign capital”. It also supports EU membership and gay rights, and opposes NATO membership. The Left aims to present itself as a strongly anti-corruption party.

Leadership
The Party is led by Croatian politician and former athlete , a former MP.

Local representation
Ljevica was represented in the council of Rijeka by two councillors and by three in assembly of Primorje-Gorski Kotar County. All were elected from the electoral list "Vladimir Bebić – Third Block list on the 2005 local elections.

2007 elections
Soon after its founding congress, the party announced a joint list with Istrian Social Democratic Forum and Croatian Social Democrats in Istria and Rijeka.

The Left also announced a coalition with Socialist Labour Party of Croatia one month before the elections.

2009 local elections
For the 2009 local elections in Rijeka, Ljevica joined with the Independent Democratic Serb Party and the Women's Democratic Party for the Zagreb local elections.

Electoral history

See also
Hrvatska ljevica
Novi Plamen
Social Democratic Party of Croatia
Socialist Labour Party of Croatia
Socialist Party of Croatia
Social Democratic Action of Croatia

References

2001 establishments in Croatia
Anti-fascism in Croatia
Anti-fascist organizations
Democratic socialist parties in Europe
Political parties established in 2001
Socialist parties in Croatia